Guardians of the Galaxy: Awesome Mix Vol. 1 (Original Motion Picture Soundtrack) is the soundtrack album for the Marvel Studios film Guardians of the Galaxy. Featuring the songs present on Peter Quill's mixtape in the film, the album was released by Hollywood Records on July 29, 2014. A separate film score album, Guardians of the Galaxy (Original Score), composed by Tyler Bates,  was also released by Hollywood Records on the same date, along with a deluxe version featuring both albums. The soundtrack album reached number one on the US Billboard 200 chart, becoming the first soundtrack album in history consisting entirely of previously released songs to top the chart.

The album topped the Billboard Top Soundtracks chart for 11 consecutive weeks and 16 weeks in total. As of April 2017, it has sold over 1.75 million copies in the United States alone, and has been certified Platinum by the RIAA. The album was the US's second best-selling soundtrack album of 2014, behind Disney's Frozen.

Background
In August 2013 the film's director, James Gunn, posted on his Facebook page that Tyler Bates would be composing the film's score. Gunn stated that Bates will write some of the score first so that he can film to the music, as opposed to scoring to the film. In February 2014, Gunn revealed that the film would incorporate songs from the 1960s and 1970s, such as "Hooked on a Feeling", on a mixtape in Quill's Walkman, which acts as a way for him to stay connected to the Earth, home, and family he lost. In May 2014, Gunn added that using the songs from the 60s and 70s were "cultural reference points", saying, "It's striking the balance throughout the whole movie, through something that is very unique, but also something that is easily accessible to people at the same time. The music and the Earth stuff is one of those touchstones that we have to remind us that, yeah, [Quill] is a real person from planet Earth who's just like you and me. Except that he's in this big outer space adventure."

Guardians of the Galaxy: Awesome Mix Vol. 1 (Original Motion Picture Soundtrack)

Track listing

All songs—with the exception of "Spirit in the Sky", which is played in the trailer—are featured in the film. "Never Been to Spain" by Three Dog Night, "Magic" by Pilot, and "Livin' Thing" by Electric Light Orchestra were also used during filming; however, the scenes in which they were featured were cut from the final version of the film. "Wichita Lineman" by Glen Campbell and "Mama Told Me (Not to Come)" by Three Dog Night were originally considered for the film instead of "Moonage Daydream". "Fox on the Run" by Sweet and "Surrender" by Cheap Trick were also considered for the film. Both would be used for Guardians of the Galaxy Vol. 2s Awesome Mix Vol. 2.

Charts and certifications
By August 2014, Guardians of the Galaxy: Awesome Mix Vol. 1 had reached the top of the Billboard 200 chart, becoming the first soundtrack album consisting entirely of previously released songs to top the chart. By September 2014, Guardians of the Galaxy: Awesome Mix Vol. 1 was the second best-selling soundtrack album in the US with 426,000 copies sold at that time. The album was also the second soundtrack album released by Disney Music Group that year to reach No. 1 on the aforementioned chart. The album was certified Gold by the Recording Industry Association of America, eight weeks after its release. An exclusive vinyl LP edition of the soundtrack was also released on September 16, 2014. The vinyl LP has been sold 367,000 units till December, 2019; making the LP 3rd best-selling vinyl album of the decade. On November 28, 2014, the soundtrack got a limited edition cassette tape release exclusive to retailers associated with Record Store Day's Black Friday event, and is the first cassette release by Disney Music Group since 2003's Classic Disney: 60 Years of Musical Magic.
The soundtrack became the fifth best-selling album of 2014, selling a total of 898,000 copies that year.
In January 2015, the album was certified platinum by the RIAA. It has sold 1.75 million total copies in the United States, with 11,000 coming from cassette sales. Worldwide, Guardians of the Galaxy: Awesome Mix Vol. 1 sold over 2.5 million copies in 2014.

Charts

Certifications

Year-end charts

Decade-end charts

Guardians of the Galaxy (Original Score)

Track listing
All music composed by Tyler Bates.

Charts

References

2014 soundtrack albums
2010s film soundtrack albums
Concept albums
Tyler Bates soundtracks
Guardians of the Galaxy (film series)
Hollywood Records albums
Marvel Cinematic Universe: Phase Two soundtracks
Marvel Music compilation albums
Record Store Day releases